Obolaria virginica, commonly known as Virginia pennywort, is a species of flowering plant in the gentian family. It is monotypic, with no other species in the genus Obolaria.

It is native to the eastern United States, where it is found in nutrient-rich forests. It is believed to be mycoheterotrophic, getting much of its nutrients though a symbiotic relationship with fungi, instead of through its small purplish-green leaves.

It is a perennial that produces white flowers in the spring. It is often difficult to locate due to its small stature, and tendency to be buried under leaf litter.

References

Gentianaceae
Monotypic Gentianales genera
Gentianaceae genera